Collected Remixes is a compilation album of remixes by American hip hop musician Alias. It was released on Anticon in 2007.

Critical reception
David Ma of XLR8R said: "Needless to say, Alias adapts seamlessly to the diverse cast and packs power into the disc's 11 tracks." Brian Howe of Pitchfork gave the album a 5.5 out of 10, saying: "Any of these on their own might impress, but collected together, they blur into anonymity, lacking the diversity or the nuance necessary to uphold the weight of the album format." Mark Schiller of PopMatters gave the album 6 stars out of 10, saying: "As long as you're not looking for innovation at every turn, Alias can punctuate a beautiful moment like few others."

Track listing

Personnel
Credits adapted from liner notes.

 Alias – remix
 Jeremy Goody – mastering
 Baillie Parker – executive production
 Sam Flax Keener – design, layout
 Matt McCullough – photography

References

External links
 

2007 compilation albums
Alias (musician) albums
Anticon albums